A Simple Symphony is a ballet made by former company dancer Melissa Barak for New York City Ballet to Benjamin Britten's eponymous music from 1934 for string orchestra. The premiere took place on Tuesday, 17 February 2009 at the David H. Koch Theater, Lincoln Center. The choreographer designed the women’s costumes. She is quoted as saying that she took inspiration from Balanchine’s La source and Raymonda Variations.

Original cast 

   
 Sara Mearns 
 Ana Sophia Scheller 
 Tiler Peck 
 
 Jared Angle 
 Tyler Angle 
 Sean Suozzi

Footnotes 

Ballets by Melissa Barak
Ballets to the music of Benjamin Britten
New York City Ballet repertory
2009 ballet premieres